The Summer of Love was a social phenomenon that occurred during the summer of 1967, when as many as 100,000 people, mostly young people sporting hippie fashions of dress and behavior, converged in San Francisco's neighborhood of Haight-Ashbury.  More broadly, the Summer of Love encompassed the hippie music, hallucinogenic drugs, anti-war, and free-love scene throughout the West Coast of the United States, and as far away as New York City.

Hippies, sometimes called flower children, were an eclectic group. Many were suspicious of the government, rejected consumerist values, and generally opposed the Vietnam War. A few were interested in politics; others were concerned more with art (music, painting, poetry in particular) or spiritual and meditative practices. While the Summer of Love is often regarded as a significant cultural event, its actual significance to ordinary young people of the time, particularly in Britain, has been disputed.

Background

Culture of San Francisco 

Inspired by Jack Kerouacs On the Road (1957) and the Beat Generation of authors of the 1950s, who had flourished in the North Beach area of San Francisco, those who gathered in Haight-Ashbury during 1967 allegedly rejected the conformist and materialist values of modern life and adhered to the psychedelic movement; there was an emphasis on sharing and community. The Diggers established a Free Store, and Haight Ashbury Free Clinics was founded on June 7, 1967, where medical treatment was provided.

Human Be-In and inspiration

The prelude to the Summer of Love was a celebration known as the Human Be-In at Golden Gate Park on January 14, 1967, which was produced and organized by artist Michael Bowen.

It was at this event that Timothy Leary voiced his phrase, "turn on, tune in, drop out". This phrase helped shape the entire hippie counterculture, as it voiced the key ideas of 1960s rebellion. These ideas included experimenting psychedelics, communal living, political decentralization, and dropping out of society. The term "dropping out" became popular among many high school and college students, many of whom would abandon their conventional education for a summer or more of hippie culture.

The event was announced by the Haight-Ashbury's hippie newspaper, the San Francisco Oracle:

A new concept of celebrations beneath the human underground must emerge, become conscious, and be shared, so a revolution can be formed with a renaissance of compassion, awareness, and love, and the revelation of unity for all mankind.

The gathering of approximately 30,000 at the Human Be-In helped publicize hippie fashions.

Planning
The term "Summer of Love" originated with the formation of the Council for the Summer of Love during the spring of 1967 as a response to the convergence of young people on the Haight-Ashbury district. The council was composed of the Family Dog hippie commune, The Straight Theatre, The Diggers, The San Francisco Oracle, and approximately 25 other people, who sought to alleviate some of the problems anticipated from the influx of young people expected during the summer. The council also assisted the Free Clinic and organized housing, food, sanitation, music and arts, along with maintaining coordination with local churches and other social groups. Psychedelic poster artist Bob Schnepf was commissioned by Chet Helms to create the official Summer of Love poster, which became a lasting icon of the era.

Beginning

Youth arrivals
College students, high school students, and runaways began streaming into the Haight during the spring break of 1967.  John F. Shelley the then-Mayor of San Francisco and the San Francisco Board of Supervisors, determined to stop the influx of young people once schools ended for the summer, unwittingly brought additional attention to the scene, and a series of articles in the San Francisco Examiner and San Francisco Chronicle alerted the national media to the hippies' growing numbers. By spring, some Haight-Ashbury organizations including Diggers theater and about 25 residents responded by forming the Council of the Summer of Love, giving the event a name.

"You only had to walk out your door to join the fun"—Mike Lafavore

Popularization
The media's coverage of hippie afflux in the Haight-Ashbury drew the attention of youth from all over America. Hunter S. Thompson termed the district "Hashbury" in The New York Times Magazine.
On February 6, 1967, Newsweek printed a four-page four-color "Dropouts on a Mission".
On March 17, 1967, Time magazine printed an article "Love on Haight".
On June 6, 1967, Newsweek printed "The Hippies are Coming".
The activities in the area were reported almost daily.

The event was also reported by the counterculture's own media, particularly the San Francisco Oracle, the pass-around readership of which is thought to have exceeded a half-million people that summer, and the Berkeley Barb.

The media's reportage of the "counterculture" included other events in California, such as the Fantasy Fair and Magic Mountain Music Festival in Marin County and the Monterey Pop Festival, both during June 1967. At Monterey, approximately 30,000 people gathered for the first day of the music festival, with the number increasing to 60,000 on the final day.  Additionally, media coverage of the Monterey Pop Festival facilitated the Summer of Love as large numbers of hippies traveled to California to hear favorite bands such as The Who, Grateful Dead, the Animals, Jefferson Airplane, Quicksilver Messenger Service, The Jimi Hendrix Experience, Otis Redding, The Byrds, and Big Brother and the Holding Company featuring Janis Joplin.

"San Francisco (Be Sure to Wear Flowers in Your Hair)"
Musician John Phillips of the band The Mamas & the Papas wrote the song "San Francisco (Be Sure to Wear Flowers in Your Hair)" for his friend Scott McKenzie. It served to promote both the Monterey Pop Festival that Phillips was helping to organize, and to popularize the flower children of San Francisco. Released on May 13, 1967, the song was an instant success. By the week ending July 1, 1967, it reached number four on the Billboard Hot 100 in the United States, where it remained for four consecutive weeks. Meanwhile, the song charted at number one in the United Kingdom and much of Europe. The single is purported to have sold more than 7 million copies worldwide.

Events

New York City 
In Manhattan, near the Greenwich Village neighborhood, during a concert in Tompkins Square Park on Memorial Day of 1967, some police officers asked for the music's volume to be reduced. In response, some people in the crowd threw various objects, and 38 arrests ensued. A debate about the "threat of the hippie" ensued between Mayor John Lindsay and Police Commissioner Howard R. Leary. After this event, Allan Katzman, the editor of the East Village Other, predicted that 50,000 hippies would enter the area for the summer.

California 
Double in size of the Tompkins Square Park concert, as many as 100,000 young people from around the world, flocked to San Francisco's Haight-Ashbury district, as well as to nearby Berkeley and to other San Francisco Bay Area cities, to join in a popularized version of the hippie culture. A Free Clinic was established for free medical treatment, and a Free Store gave away basic necessities without charge to anyone who needed them.

The Summer of Love attracted a wide range of people of various ages: teenagers and college students drawn by their peers and the allure of joining an alleged cultural utopia; middle-class vacationers; and even partying military personnel from bases within driving distance. The Haight-Ashbury could not accommodate this influx of people, and the neighborhood scene quickly deteriorated, with overcrowding, homelessness, hunger, drug problems, and crime afflicting the neighborhood.

Denver 
Chet Helms, Barry Fey and others who were constructing The Family Dog Denver in the summer of 1967 also held a Human Be-In, in Denver's City Park, with the goal of harnessing the Summer of Love vibe to promote Helm's new Family Dog Productions venture, which opened in September, 1967. 5,000 people attended the Be-In, with performances by bands like the Grateful Dead, Odetta and Captain Beefheart. Ken Kesey and Timothy Leary were also reportedly in attendance. As Denver native Bruce Bond states in the 2021 documentary The Tale of the Dog, "It's not like the Summer of Love ended in Frisco. It just moved east, to Denver."

Use of drugs

Psychedelic drug use became common. Grateful Dead guitarist Bob Weir commented:

Haight Ashbury was a ghetto of bohemians who wanted to do anything—and we did but I don't think it has happened since. Yes there was LSD. But Haight Ashbury was not about drugs. It was about exploration, finding new ways of expression, being aware of one's existence.

After losing his untenured position as an instructor on the Psychology faculty at Harvard University, Timothy Leary became a major advocate for the recreational use of psychedelic drugs. After starting  taking psilocybin in the late fifties, a psychoactive chemical produced by certain mushrooms that causes effects similar to those of LSD, Leary endorsed the use of all psychedelics for personal development. He often invited friends as well as an occasional graduate student to consume such drugs along with him and colleague Richard Alpert.

On the West Coast, author Ken Kesey, a prior volunteer for a CIA-started to sponsor LSD experiment in the early sixties, and also advocated the use of the drug. Soon after participating, he was inspired to write the bestselling novel One Flew Over the Cuckoo's Nest. Subsequently, after buying an old school bus, painting it with psychedelic graffiti and attracting a group of similarly minded individuals he dubbed the Merry Pranksters, Kesey and his group traveled across the country, often hosting "acid tests" where they would fill a large container with a diluted low dose form of the drug and give out diplomas to those who passed their test.

Along with LSD, cannabis started to be much used during this period. However, as a result, crime increased among users because new laws were subsequently enacted to control the use of both drugs. The users thereof often had sessions to oppose the laws, including The Human Be-In referenced above as well as various "smoke-ins" during July and August; however, their efforts at repeal were unsuccessful.

Funeral and aftermath
 
By the end of summer, many participants had left the scene to join the back-to-the-land movement of the late 1960s, to resume school studies, or simply to "get a job". Those remaining in the Haight wanted to commemorate the conclusion of the event. A mock funeral entitled "The Death of the Hippie" ceremony was staged on October 6, 1967, and organizer Mary Kasper explained the intended message:

In New York, the rock musical drama Hair, which told the story of the hippie counterculture and sexual revolution of the 1960s, began Off-Broadway on October 17, 1967.

Legacy

Second Summer of Love

The "Second Summer of Love" (a term which generally refers to the summers of both 1988 and 1989) was a renaissance of acid house music and rave parties in Britain. The culture supported MDMA use and some LSD use. The art had a generally psychedelic emotion reminiscent of the 1960s.

40th anniversary
During the summer of 2007, San Francisco celebrated the 40th anniversary of the Summer of Love by holding numerous events around the region, culminating on September 2, 2007, when over 150,000 people attended the 40th anniversary of the Summer of Love concert, held in Golden Gate Park in Speedway Meadows. It was produced by 2b1 Multimedia and the Council of Light.

50th anniversary

In 2016, 2b1 Multimedia and The Council of Light, once again, began the planning for the 50th Anniversary of the Summer of Love in Golden Gate Park in San Francisco. By the beginning of 2017, the council had gathered about 25 poster artists, about 10 of whom submitted their finished art, but it was never printed. The council was also contacted by many bands and musicians who wanted to be part of this historic event, all were waiting for the date to be determined before a final commitment. New rules enforced by the San Francisco Parks and Recreational Department (PRD) prohibited the council from holding a free event of the proposed size. There were many events planned for San Francisco in 2017, many of which were 50th Anniversary-themed. However, there was no free concert. The PRD later hosted an event originally called “Summer Solstice Party,” but it was later renamed “50th Anniversary of the Summer of Love” two weeks before commencement. The event had fewer than 20,000 attendees from the local Bay Area.

In frustration, producer Boots Hughston put the proposal of what was by then to be a 52nd anniversary free concert into the form of an initiative intended for the November 6, 2018, ballot.  The issue did not make the ballot; however, a more generic Proposition E provides for directing hotel tax fees to a $32 million budget for "arts and cultural organizations and projects in the city."

During the summer of 2017, San Francisco celebrated the 50th anniversary of the Summer of Love by holding numerous events and art exhibitions.
In Liverpool, the city has staged a 50 Summers of Love festival based on the 50th anniversary of the June 1, 1967, release of the album Sgt Pepper's Lonely Hearts Club Band, by The Beatles.

See also

 Counterculture of the 1960s
 1967 in music
 Acid rock
 Allen Ginsberg
 David Peel
 Deadhead
 Central Park be-ins
 Commune
 Grateful Dead
 Hippies
 Jefferson Airplane
 John Lennon
 Neil Young
 Nick St. Nicholas
 Psychedelia
 Psychedelic rock
 Season of the Witch: Enchantment, Terror, and Deliverance in the City of Love

References
Notes

Further reading

External links
 Summer of Love: 40 years later, from SFGate
 What Was The Summer Of Love?: A 50th Anniversary Explainer  – SFist
 The Summer of Love Wasn’t All Peace and Hippies – JSTOR
 The Summer of Love, Performers in Britain and the United States , Oxford Dictionary of National Biography and the American National Biography
 John Griffiths. Summer of Love, in Britain
 Kate Daloz The Hippies Who Hated the Summer of Love Longreads
 CIS: 'Summer of Love' Reached Behind Iron Curtain, by Salome Asatiani. RFE/RL, August 30, 2007 (an article about the impact of the Summer of Love event on Soviet youth culture)
 PBS, The American Experience: Summer of Love , 2007
 Peter Berg (bioregionalist) interviewed about the Summer of Love for The American Experience, PBS
 A Taste of Summer 2007-10-09 BBC Radio 2

1967 in the United States
Counterculture of the 1960s
Hippie movement
Haight-Ashbury, San Francisco
1960s in San Francisco
Sexual revolution
1967 in California
1960s fads and trends
1967 in American music
1967 in San Francisco